Anthony Paul Claggett (born July 15, 1984) is an American college baseball coach and former Major League Baseball pitcher. He is the pitching coach at Washington State University. He played college baseball at University of California, Riverside. He played for the New York Yankees and Pittsburgh Pirates in 2009. Since 2014, Claggett has been a coach at both the collegiate and professional levels.

Amateur career
Claggett attended the University of California, Riverside, where he played college baseball for the Highlanders from 2003 to 2005.

Professional career

Detroit Tigers
Claggett was originally selected by the Detroit Tigers in the 11th round of the 2005 Major League Baseball Draft. The New York Yankees acquired him from Detroit, along with right-handed pitchers Humberto Sánchez and Kevin Whelan, in exchange for outfielder Gary Sheffield on November 10, 2006.

New York Yankees
The New York Yankees acquired him from Detroit, along with right-handed pitchers Humberto Sánchez and Kevin Whelan, in exchange for outfielder Gary Sheffield on November 10, 2006. He spent the majority of the 2008 season with Double-A Trenton, going 4–2 with nine saves and a 2.15 ERA in 29 relief appearances for the Eastern League champions. He began the year on the disabled list with a left hamstring strain, then made one appearance at Single-A Tampa (3.0 IP, 1 ER) before being transferred to Trenton. All but five of his outings in 2008 were more than 1.0 inning. Claggett was added to the Yankees' 40-man roster following the  season to protect him from the Rule 5 draft. Claggett began the  season with the Triple-A Scranton/Wilkes-Barre Yankees.  He was called up to the majors on April 18, 2009, making his major league debut that day where he gave up eight runs in 1 innings and finished with an ERA of 43.20.  He was then sent back to Scranton/Wilkes-Barre.  Claggett was called up on August 5, 2009, replacing Cody Ransom.  He was optioned back to Triple-A on August 7 to make room for infielder Ramiro Peña.  On September 14, he was designated for assignment.  On September 24, he was claimed by the Pittsburgh Pirates.

Pittsburgh Pirates
On September 24, 2009, Claggett was claimed by the Pittsburgh Pirates. On January 21, 2010, Claggett was designated for assignment by the Pittsburgh Pirates to make room on the roster for Octavio Dotel. After the 2011 season Claggett was granted free agency.

Independent Leagues
Claggett signed with the Somerset Patriots of the Atlantic League on March 28, 2012. On June 5, 2012, he was released. In June 2012, he signed with the St. Paul Saints. He played for the Saints during the 2014 season as well, pitching in 19 games for the club.

Coaching career
While still playing minor league baseball, Claggett worked in his first coaching position in 2014 as pitching coach and recruiting coordinator at the College of the Desert, a junior college in Palm Desert, California. In 2015, Claggett became pitching coach for the New Jersey Jackals of the Can-Am League. Returning to the collegiate level, Claggett was pitching coach and recruiting coordinator at Riverside City College in 2016.

Claggett moved up to the NCAA Division I level in 2017 as volunteer assistant coach at San Jose State under Jason Hawkins. In 2018 and 2019, Claggett served as pitching coach at New Mexico State under Brian Green. Claggett followed Green to Washington State University in the summer of 2019.

References

External links

Baseball players from California
Major League Baseball pitchers
Oneonta Tigers players
West Michigan Whitecaps players
Toledo Mud Hens players
Tampa Yankees players
Scranton/Wilkes-Barre Yankees players
Trenton Thunder players
New York Yankees players
Pittsburgh Pirates players
Altoona Curve players
Somerset Patriots players
People from Hemet, California
Sportspeople from Riverside County, California
1984 births
Living people
UC Riverside Highlanders baseball players
St. Paul Saints players
Perth Heat players
Honolulu Sharks players
Bravos de Margarita players
American expatriate baseball players in Venezuela
Cañeros de Los Mochis players
San Jose State Spartans baseball coaches
New Mexico State Aggies baseball coaches
College of the Desert Roadrunners baseball coaches
Washington State Cougars baseball coaches
American expatriate baseball players in Australia